Gift of Song is the second studio album released in 1970 by Australian recording artist Judith Durham.

The album was re-released in 1973 and again on CD and digitally in 2012.

The album produced the singles, "The Light Is Dark Enough"/"Wanderlove" which was released in January 1970 and "Take Care of My Brother".

Reception
Richie Unterberger from AllMusic gave the album 3 out of 5 saying "This seems to be A&M's (unsuccessful) attempt to break ex-Seeker Judith Durham into the American pop market. Not much of The Seekers' folk-pop is left on this heavily, though tastefully, orchestrated production. Durham and her handlers seem to be aiming for a Judy Collins-like Baroque-folk on many cuts, and (in other parallel with Collins) some theatrical art song-informed songs. Durham's voice is not as good or expressive as Collins', and her material isn't as stellar either. For all that, this isn't a bad record, particularly when it does get into its most melancholy classical-Baroque arrangements on "Wanderlove," "There's a Baby," and similar numbers. A couple of Mason Williams songs, "Wanderlove" and "Here Am I," are among the better offerings, and there's also a relatively little-known Harry Nilsson song, "Wailing of the Willow"."

Track listing
 LP/ Cassette
	"Wanderlove"	(Mason Williams) - 2:35
	"I Wish I Knew" (Roger Nichols, Hal Levy) - 2:50
	"There's a Baby" (Alan Bernstein, Vic Millrose) - 2:52	
	"That's How My Love Is" (Clive Westlake) - 3:10
	"I Can Say" (David Reilly) - 3:38
	"Gift of Song"	(Patti Ingalls) - 3:08
	"Wailing of the Willow" (Harry Nilsson) - 2:29
	"The Light Is Dark Enough" (Jean Maitland, Richard Kerr) - 2:39
	"Take Care of My Brother" (Art Podell) - 3:00 	
	"God Bless the Child" (Arthur Herzog, Jr., Billie Holiday) - 2:49	
	"Here Am I" (Mason Williams) - 2:33

Personnel
Judith Durham - vocals
Steve LeFever - bass
Hal Blaine - drums
Richard Clements - arrangements
Erno Neufeld - concertmaster
Technical
Mike Shields - engineer
Tom Wilkes - art direction
Jim McCrary - photography

External links
 "Gift of Song" at discogs.com

References

Judith Durham albums
1970 albums
A&M Records albums